Gianmarco Fabbri (born 25 June 1997) is an Italian football player. He plays for Sangiustese.

Club career
He made his Serie C debut for Fano on 27 August 2017 in a game against Bassano Virtus.

References

External links
 
 

1997 births
People from Senigallia
Living people
Italian footballers
Alma Juventus Fano 1906 players
Santarcangelo Calcio players
Serie C players
Serie D players
Association football defenders
Sportspeople from the Province of Ancona
Footballers from Marche
A.C. Sangiustese players